Pocahontas High School may refer to:
 Pocahontas High School (Arkansas)
 Pocahontas High School (Iowa), winner of the National High School Mock Trial Championship

See also
 Pocahontas County High School, West Virginia